Heads Nook is a village close to the market town of Brampton within the City of Carlisle district.  It is in the English county of Cumbria.

Nearby settlements 
Nearby settlements include the city of Carlisle, the villages of Warwick Bridge and Fenton and the hamlets of Broadwath and Allenwood.

References 

A-Z Carlisle (page 20)

Hamlets in Cumbria
Wetheral
Hayton, Carlisle